Martin Alper (1942 – June 7, 2015) was a video game designer and the former President of Virgin Interactive, once one of the largest companies in the field. Alper was a co-founder of Mastertronic, which went on to become Virgin Interactive following its acquisition by Richard Branson. He was involved with the development of Command & Conquer at Westwood Studios and Shiny Entertainment who developed The Matrix and Earthworm Jim. He was also the person who approached Westwood Studios co-founder Brett Sperry about creating Dune II. 

Alper also provided the voice acting for EVA in the original Command & Conquer: Red Alert.

References

External links

1942 births
2015 deaths
Video game designers
Virgin Group people